Clean Tech Nation: How the U.S. Can Lead in the New Global Economy is a 2012 book written by Ron Pernick and Clint Wilder. The book surveys the expansion of clean technology and renewable energy over the past decade. It tracks the growth of wind power and solar photovoltaics and shows that these markets grew 20 fold from 2000 to 2010. Factors which are driving the global expansion of clean tech are identified, as are the new economic opportunities which are being created. China, the United States, and Germany are leading the way. Clean Tech Nation is the sequel to the 2007 book The Clean Tech Revolution.

See also

List of books about renewable energy
List of books about energy issues
Renewable energy commercialization
Renewable energy policy
Sustainable business

References

2012 non-fiction books
Appropriate technology
Books about energy issues
Energy economics
Renewable energy commercialization
Sustainability books
HarperCollins books